Riethnordhausen may refer to the following places in Germany:

 Riethnordhausen, Saxony-Anhalt
 Riethnordhausen, Thuringia